Paul Jacobs (August 24, 1918 – January 3, 1978) was a pioneering activist, journalist, and co-founder of Mother Jones magazine. In 1966, he signed a tax resistance vow to protest the Vietnam War.

In 1968, Jacobs was the nominee of the Peace and Freedom Party for U.S. Senate from California. He received 1.31% of the vote. 

He is the subject of the 1980 political documentary Paul Jacobs and the Nuclear Gang, which details his investigation into government cover-up of the health hazards related to nuclear weapons testing in 1950s Nevada.

References 

1918 births
1978 deaths
20th-century American non-fiction writers
American activist journalists
American investigative journalists
American male journalists
American tax resisters
Deaths from lung cancer
Journalists from New York City
Townsend Harris High School alumni
20th-century American male writers
Peace and Freedom Party politicians
Activists from California
American anti–Vietnam War activists